Hazel Run Township is a township in Yellow Medicine County, Minnesota, United States. The population was 194 at the 2000 census.

Hazel Run Township was organized in 1877.

Geography

Demographics
As of the census of 2000, there were 194 people, 72 households, and 55 families residing in the township.  The population density was 5.4 people per square mile (2.1/km2).  There were 78 housing units at an average density of 2.2/sq mi (0.8/km2).  The racial makeup of the township was 95.36% White, 1.03% Native American, 3.61% from other races. Hispanic or Latino of any race were 4.12% of the population.

There were 72 households, out of which 43.1% had children under the age of 18 living with them, 70.8% were married couples living together, 2.8% had a female householder with no husband present, and 23.6% were non-families. 22.2% of all households were made up of individuals, and 12.5% had someone living alone who was 65 years of age or older.  The average household size was 2.69 and the average family size was 3.11.

In the township the population was spread out, with 30.4% under the age of 18, 4.6% from 18 to 24, 29.9% from 25 to 44, 17.5% from 45 to 64, and 17.5% who were 65 years of age or older.  The median age was 37 years. For every 100 females, there were 96.0 males.  For every 100 females age 18 and over, there were 98.5 males.

The median income for a household in the township was $46,406, and the median income for a family was $47,188. Males had a median income of $28,750 versus $20,625 for females. The per capita income for the township was $20,053.  About 6.2% of families and 8.5% of the population were below the poverty line, including 13.6% of those under the age of eighteen and none of those 65 or over.

References

Townships in Yellow Medicine County, Minnesota
Townships in Minnesota